"Tell Me When to Go" is the first single from E-40's BME/Warner Bros. debut, My Ghetto Report Card. Keak da Sneak is also featured on the track. It was produced by Lil Jon, and one of the first singles to kick off the hyphy movement on a national level and popularized the phrase "ghost ride the whip".  The song reached number 35 in the U.S. and eventually was certified Gold by the RIAA. The song first premiered online on the MySpace.com homepage and it was the first hip hop single to premiere online before being released.

The song samples "Dumb Girl" by Run-DMC.

The song is featured in the 2007 Xbox 360/PlayStation 3 video game Def Jam: Icon. E-40 is a playable character in the video game and provides his own voice and likeness. It also appeared in “The Fugitive”, a season 4 episode of the scripted comedy series Brooklyn Nine-Nine.

Music video
The black and white music video, produced by production company Immigrant Films, was directed and edited by Bernard Gourley and lensed by cinematographer David Claessen. Filmed at the abandoned 16th Street station in West Oakland, it features cameo appearances from D-Shot, Dem Hoodstarz, Haji Springer, Too Short, Lil Jon, Rick Rock, The Federation, Battle Loco, Lil Scrappy, J. Valentine, Mistah F.A.B., Big Rich, Turf Talk, The Crest Creepaz, Frank D. and the Architeckz turf dancing crew with choreography by Jeriel Bey.

In 2016, director Dante Ariola and cinematographer Chris Soos recreated the music video for a Beats Studio Wireless  headphones commercial, also titled – and set to – "Tell Me When to Go", starring Golden State Warriors' power forward Draymond Green and featuring E-40 and cameos by Green's then-Warriors teammates Ian Clark, Brandon Rush, and Shaun Livingston as well as Oakland natives Gary Payton and Brian Shaw. The 90-second version also features Keak da Sneak. The spot is one of three that earned Ariola a DGA best commercial director nomination in 2017.

Live performances
"Tell Me When to Go" was performed live, the day before the 2006 MTV Video Music Awards in a club in New York City. This performance featured E-40 and Lil Jon rapping, while a rock instrumental was played by Metal Skool. The event was held at Snitch, a rock-themed club.

Charts

Remixes
The official remix features a new verse from E-40 and features Kanye West, Ice Cube, and The Game.

The "Bay Area Remix" includes the entire Hyphy roster. It features Too Short, B-Legit, Clyde Carson, Turf Talk, Richie Rich, San Quinn, The Federation, Hoodstarz, Messy Marv, Mistah F.A.B., Yukmouth, Big Rich, PSD, J-Diggs and rap group Balance. At the start of the song, E-40 proclaims "RIP Mac Dre, Dre you supposed to be on this one baby", referring to rapper Mac Dre, who is considered the originator of the Hyphy Movement.

Another remix was done by Chingo Bling entitled "Tell Me When to Go (Remix)" from the album "They All Want Him, But Who Can Afford Him"

Another popular remix was done by producer Trackademicks entitled "Tell Me When To Go (Trackademicks Remix)", released in February 2006 on his independently released compilation,  'The Spring Progress Report'.

Cultural impact
In March 2022 a music documentary about the Hyphy movement We Were Hyphy, was released. It explored the part "Tell Me When to Go" played in the Hyphy movement, as well as interviewing many of the well-known artists of the time, such as Keak da Sneak, and Rick Rock. It also featured contemporaneous musicians, including G-Eazy, Kamaiyah and P-Lo talking about the Hyphy movement.

Certifications

References

2005 songs
2006 singles
E-40 songs
Keak da Sneak songs
Black-and-white music videos
Asylum Records singles
Song recordings produced by Lil Jon
Songs written by Darryl McDaniels
Songs written by Joseph Simmons
Songs written by E-40